Ketchum Glacier is an eastward flowing glacier at the base of Palmer Land, Antarctica, about  long, descending between the Latady Mountains and the Scaife Mountains into Gardner Inlet. It was discovered by the Ronne Antarctic Research Expedition (RARE), 1947–48, under Finn Ronne, who named it for Commander  Gerald Ketchum, U.S. Navy, commander of the icebreaker  which broke the ice to free the RARE from Marguerite Bay for the return home.

See also
 List of glaciers in the Antarctic

References

Glaciers of Palmer Land